Ismaila Diop (born 19 December 1999) is a Senegalese football player. He plays in Albania for Apolonia.

Club career

Ascoli
On 26 May 2017, Diop signed his first professional contract with Ascoli for a three-year term.

Loan to Paganese
On 24 August 2018, Diop joined Paganese on a season-long loan. He made his Serie C debut for Paganese on 16 September 2018 in a game against Rende.

Serie C
On 31 July 2019, he signed a 2-year contract with Serie C club Fano.

On 5 October 2020, he joined Fermana. On 27 January 2021, his contract with Fermana was terminated by mutual consent.

Albania
After his release by Fermana, he joined Albanian club Apolonia and made his debut for the club on 31 January 2021 against KF Tirana.

References

External links
 

1999 births
Living people
Senegalese footballers
Association football defenders
Ascoli Calcio 1898 F.C. players
Paganese Calcio 1926 players
Alma Juventus Fano 1906 players
Fermana F.C. players
KF Apolonia Fier players
Serie C players
Kategoria Superiore players
Senegalese expatriate footballers
Expatriate footballers in Italy
Expatriate footballers in Albania